George FM is a New Zealand dance music radio station, owned and operated by MediaWorks from its Hargreaves Street headquarters and relayed on Freeview and radio frequencies around New Zealand. Its seventy-five regular presenters and additional guest presenters host the station's twenty-four-hour mix of house, breaks, drum and bass, dubstep, electro, soul, downbeat, jazz, funk, indie electronic, hip-hop and other dance and electronic music.

The network was set up as a volunteer-run low power station based in a Grey Lynn spare bedroom in 1998. It became a commercial station with paid staff by 2003, began to be relayed to other centres in subsequent years, became a Freeview station on 1 May 2008 and was bought out by MediaWorks on 16 February 2009. It continues to retain a laid-back style: news is limited to informal news, weather, traffic and surf reports hourly during breakfast and drive shows and the choice of music and presenting style is entirely that of programme hosts.

Stations

George FM broadcasts a network programme on full-power FM and low-power FM frequencies. It also broadcasts via the Freeview and Rova platforms.

It was previously available on low-power frequencies in Whangarei, Rotorua, Taupo, Napier, New Plymouth, Whanganui, Te Anau and Invercargill. The network has retained low-power broadcasts in Hamilton, Tauranga, Palmerston North, Wellington, Christchurch and Dunedin, and has full-power broadcasts in Nelson and Queenstown.

Frequencies

 Auckland 96.6 FM
 Hamilton 107.3 FM (low-power)
 Tauranga 107.4 FM (low-power)
 Palmerston North 107.1 FM (low-power)
 Wellington 106.7 FM (low-power)
 Nelson 95.2 FM
 Christchurch 106.9 FM (low-power)
 Dunedin 107.1 FM (low-power) 
 Queenstown 96.8 FM
 Freeview channel 70

References

External links
George FM official website

 
Radio stations established in 1998
Radio stations established in 2003
Electronic dance music radio stations